The Laws-Jarvis House is a historic house at 409 North Main Street in Beebe, Arkansas.  It is a single-story wood-frame structure, with a weatherboard exterior and brick foundation.  Its original form, as built about 1880, featured an L-shaped layout, with  central entrance gabled porch supported by slender columns with plain capitals, and windows with pedimented lintels.  It has since been altered by an addition to the rear, giving its roof an overall hip shape.  The house is one of White County's surviving 19th-century houses.

The house was listed on the National Register of Historic Places in 1992.

See also
National Register of Historic Places listings in White County, Arkansas

References

Houses on the National Register of Historic Places in Arkansas
Houses completed in 1880
Houses in White County, Arkansas
National Register of Historic Places in White County, Arkansas
Buildings and structures in Beebe, Arkansas
1880 establishments in Arkansas